Shobha Kapoor (born 1 February 1949) is an Indian television, film and web series producer. She is the managing director of Balaji Telefilms Limited, a film, TV and web series production house in Mumbai, India, run by her and her daughter Ekta Kapoor.

Kapoor takes care of the overall administrative and production activities of Balaji Telefilms.

Personal life
Before marriage, she was an airhostess. Kapoor is married to actor Jeetendra. The couple has two children, Ekta Kapoor (b. 1975), who is a producer, and Tusshar Kapoor (b. 1976), who is an actor.

Filmography (as producer)

Movies
The following is the long list of motion pictures produced by Kapoor under her banner Balaji Motion Pictures.

Web series

References

External links
 

Indian women film producers
Indian women television producers
Indian television producers
Living people
Sindhi people
Film producers from Mumbai
Businesswomen from Maharashtra
20th-century Indian businesswomen
20th-century Indian businesspeople
21st-century Indian businesswomen
21st-century Indian businesspeople
Women television producers
1946 births